Medley is a town in Miami-Dade County, Florida, United States. The community was named after its founder, Sylvester Medley. The town was incorporated in 1949, but Sylvester settled the current town in 1905 and farmed there until his death in 1950. Located in the western part of the county, its primary tax base is industrial development, explaining its small population and high density. The town is home to a Rinker plant, one of its largest businesses. It is also home to the Titan America Pennsuco Cement Plant.

Geography
It is bordered to the north by Hialeah Gardens and to the east by Hialeah. Doral is to the south. The Miami Canal forms the border between Medley and the cities of Hialeah Gardens and Hialeah.

Surrounding areas
  Hialeah Gardens, Hialeah
 Unincorporated Miami-Dade County    Hialeah Gardens, Hialeah
 Unincorporated Miami-Dade County   Hialeah Gardens, Hialeah
 Unincorporated Miami-Dade County    Miami Springs
 Doral

Demographics

2020 census

As of the 2020 United States census, there were 1,056 people, 354 households, and 248 families residing in the town.

2010 census

As of 2010, there were 350 households, out of which 4.9% were vacant. In 2000, 34.7% had children under the age of 18 living with them, 54.3% were married couples living together, 12.7% had a female householder with no husband present, and 26.4% were non-families. 20.7% of all households were made up of individuals, and 9.1% had someone living alone who was 65 years of age or older. The average household size was 2.76 and the average family size was 3.15.

2000 census
In 2000, the town population was spread out, with 23.7% under the age of 18, 4.9% from 18 to 24, 29.1% from 25 to 44, 26.7% from 45 to 64, and 15.6% who were 65 years of age or older. The median age was 40 years. For every 100 females, there were 100.0 males. For every 100 females age 18 and over, there were 101.4 males.

In 2000, the median income for a household in the town was $23,167, and the median income for a family was $25,909. Males had a median income of $26,964 versus $18,409 for females. The per capita income for the town was $11,955. About 14.3% of families and 20.0% of the population were below the poverty line, including 16.0% of those under age 18 and 33.5% of those age 65 or over. New households (condominiums) are being constructed along the Miami River in order to raise house quality.

As of 2000, speakers of Spanish as a first language accounted for 83.65%, and English as a first language made up 16.35% of the population.

Education
Medley is in the Miami-Dade County Public Schools system. Residents are zoned to Ronald W. Reagan/Doral Senior High School.

References

External links
 

Towns in Miami-Dade County, Florida
Towns in Florida